Pleurothallis cordata is a species of orchid occurring from western South America to Venezuela.

cordata
Orchids of South America